Teresita J. Herbosa (born October 28, 1950) was the chairwoman of the Securities and Exchange Commission (Philippines).  She was appointed to the SEC by President Benigno Aquino III and took office on April 29, 2011. As Chairperson, she is also a member of the Anti-Money Laundering Council (Philippines).

Herbosa has two bachelor's degrees from the University of the Philippines and a Master of Comparative Law degree from the University of Michigan Law School.  Prior to her government service she was a co-managing partner of the Angara, Abello, Concepcion, Regala & Cruz Law Offices. She is presently an associate professor at the De La Salle University - College of Law, where she teaches courses in Corporation Law and Commercial Law Review.

References

1950 births
20th-century Filipino lawyers
Living people
Heads of government agencies of the Philippines
University of Michigan Law School alumni
University of the Philippines alumni
Filipino women lawyers
Filipino business executives
Women business executives
Benigno Aquino III administration personnel
Duterte administration personnel